Gallifrey is a fictional planet in the long-running British science fiction television series Doctor Who. It is the original home world of the Time Lords, the civilisation to which the protagonist, the Doctor belongs. It is located in a binary star system 250 million light years from Earth.

It was first shown in The War Games (1969) during the Second Doctor's trial, though it was not identified by name until The Time Warrior (1973–74).

In the revived series (2005 onwards), Gallifrey was originally referred to as having been destroyed in the Time War, which was fought between the Time Lords and the Daleks. It was depicted in a flashback in "The Sound of Drums" (2007) and appeared prominently in "The End of Time" (2009–10). At the conclusion of "The Day of the Doctor" (2013), Gallifrey is revealed to have actually survived the Time War, though it was frozen in time and transported into a bubble universe, before being unfrozen and arriving at the end of the universe at a chronological point before "Hell Bent" (2015). By "Spyfall" (2020), it had been reduced to ruin by The Master who described the planet as hiding in its bubble universe again. At the end of "The Timeless Children" (2020), one of the Doctor's allies, Ko Sharmus, detonates the "Death Particle" on Gallifrey, wiping out all organic life on the planet, the Master and his army of Cyber-Masters presumably included.

The points in time when Gallifrey appears are never definitively stated. As the planet is often reached by means of time travel, its relative present could conceivably exist almost anywhere in the Earth's past or future, as well as anywhere in the conceivable universe.

Geography and appearances

From space, Gallifrey is seen as a yellow-orange planet and was close enough to central space lanes for spacecraft to require clearance from Gallifreyan Space Traffic Control as they pass through its system. The planet was protected from physical attack by an impenetrable barrier called the quantum force field, and from teleportation incursions by the transduction barrier—which could be reinforced to repel most levels of this type of technological attack.

The Time Lords' principal city, named The Capitol, consists of shining towers protected by a mighty glass dome. Outside The Capitol is a wilderness with plains of red grass, as mentioned by the Doctor in Gridlock as well as "The End of Time". The planet's so-called "second city" is Arcadia, and is seen falling to the Daleks in the 2013 minisode "The Last Day."

The Doctor's granddaughter Susan first describes her home world (not named as "Gallifrey" at the time) as having bright, silver-leafed trees and a burnt orange sky at night in the serial The Sensorites (1964). This casts an amber tint on anything outside the city, as seen in The Invasion of Time. However, Gallifrey's sky appears blue and Earth-like in The Five Doctors (1983) within the isolated Death Zone.

In The Time Monster, the Third Doctor says that "When I was a little boy, we used to live in a house that was perched halfway up the top of a mountain", explaining, "I ran down that mountain and I found that the rocks weren't grey at all—but they were red, brown and purple and gold. And those pathetic little patches of sludgy snow were shining white. Shining white in the sunlight." In "Gridlock", the Tenth Doctor echoes Susan's description of the world now named as Gallifrey and goes further by mentioning the vast mountain ranges "with fields of deep red grass, capped with snow". He then elaborates how Gallifrey's second sun would "rise in the south and the mountains would shine", with the silver-leafed trees looking like "a forest on fire" in the mornings.

Outer Gallifrey's wastelands are where the "Outsiders" reside, The Doctor Who Role Playing Game released by FASA equates the Outsiders with the "Shobogans", who are briefly mentioned in the serial The Deadly Assassin. The wastes of Gallifrey include the Death Zone, an area that was used as a gladiatorial arena by the first Time Lords, pitting various species kidnapped from their respective time zones against each other (although Daleks and Cybermen were considered too dangerous to use). Inside the Death Zone stands the Tomb of Rassilon, the founder of Time Lord society.

Somewhere on Gallifrey there is also an institute called the Academy, which the Doctor and various other Time Lords have attended.

"The Last Day" mentions birds as something expected in Gallifrey's skies. Gallifrey appeared in the Doctor Who 50th anniversary special, "The Day of the Doctor" which aired on 23 November 2013.

Spin-off material
Several of the spin-off novels have further information about Gallifrey. It is said to have at least two moons, one being the copper-coloured Pazithi Gallifreya (first named in Cat's Cradle: Time's Crucible); the novel Lungbarrow also places Karn (setting of The Brain of Morbius, 1976) in Gallifrey's solar system, along with a frozen gas giant named Polarfrey and an "astrological figure" of "Kasterborous the Fibster". Cat's Cradle: Time's Crucible also mentions edible rodent-like mammals called tafelshrews.

Relative time
The Three Doctors (1972–73) seemed to set Gallifrey's relative present contemporary with the events of the story set on Earth, with its sequel Arc of Infinity (1983) setting it in the 1980s. Alternatively, The Trial of a Time Lord (1986) seems to imply that the planet's relative present is in the Earth's far future. This is also the position taken by The Doctor Who Role Playing Game released by FASA, although the information in it is not usually considered canon. In the episode "Utopia" (2007), the Tenth Doctor describes the year 100 trillion as a time period not even the Time Lords travelled to. The present of Gallifrey from after it returns to the universe from another dimension is stated to be around the end of the universe, "several billion years in the future", in "Hell Bent" (2015). Both the Virgin New Adventures and the BBC Books Doctor Who novels seem to take the stance that Gallifrey's relative present is far in the Earth's relative past. In "Spyfall," the Master states that Gallifrey is once again in the bubble universe it was sent to in "The Day of the Doctor." The Master causes a wormhole called "The Boundary" to connect to Gallifrey from the far future in "Ascension of the Cybermen" and "The Timeless Children" though he refuses to answer the Doctor's questions about how he accomplished this.

Race of Gallifrey
The television series and people involved in its production repeatedly refer to the Time Lords, interchangeably, as a species or race. In The War Games (1969), the Second Doctor says the Time Lords are "an immensely civilised race". Writer Malcolm Hulke and writer and script editor Terrance Dicks repeat this description in their 1972 book The Making of Doctor Who. In The Time Warrior (1973–74), Commander Linx quotes Sontaran military intelligence as describing the Time Lords as "A race of great technical achievement, but lacking the morale to withstand a determined assault." In Pyramids of Mars (1975), Sutekh calls the Time Lords "a perfidious species". In "School Reunion" (2006), the alien Krillitane Mr Finch calls the Time Lords "such a pompous race". In "Smith and Jones" (2007), the Tenth Doctor answers "what sort of species [he is]" with "I'm a Time Lord." In "Human Nature" (2007), Tim Latimer hears a voice saying, "Last of the Time Lords, the last of that wise and ancient race." In "Utopia" (2007), the Tenth Doctor answers "what species are you" with "Time Lord, last of." In "The Sound of Drums" (2007), the Tenth Doctor calls the Time Lords "the oldest and most mighty race in the universe". In "Planet of the Dead" (2009), the Tenth Doctor says, "I come from a race of people called Time Lords." About sixteen minutes into "Let's Kill Hitler" (2011), a computer readout describes the "Pilot Species" of the Doctor's ship the TARDIS as "Time Lord". In "The Witch's Familiar" (2015), Davros describes a prophecy that spoke of a "hybrid creature [of] two great warrior races forced together to create a warrior greater than either," and believes that the creature being referred to was "half Dalek, half Time Lord." In "Before the Flood" (2015), the Fisher King describes the Time Lords as "the most warlike race in the galaxy". In "Hell Bent" (2015), the General describes the Hybrid as being "crossbred between two warrior races". He says it is supposed that these races are "the Daleks and the Time Lords". In "Knock Knock" (2017), the Twelfth Doctor tells Bill Potts the Time Lords are "my species". Writing in issue No. 356 of Doctor Who Magazine, head writer and executive producer Russell T Davies describes the Time Lords as "the Doctor's race". In a special feature on the DVD set of The Invasion of Time, script editor Anthony Read called the Time Lords "an interesting species to somebody coming in". In a special feature on the DVD and Blu-ray set of series 8, actor Peter Capaldi said the Doctor belongs to "a race called the Time Lords". Terrance Dicks recalled in a 2016 interview in The Essential Doctor Who magazine that during a discussion of The War Games, producer Derrick Sherwin said the Doctor belongs to "this mysterious race called Time Lords". The Time Lords are also referred to as a race by media outlets including the Radio Times and The New York Times, while a correction in a 2014 NPR article claims that "not all Gallifreyans are Time Lords". "The Stolen Tardis" (1979), a spin-off comic printed in issue No. 9 of Doctor Who Weekly (the original name of Doctor Who Magazine) also claims that "not everyone on Gallifrey is a Time Lord", while a feature in issue No. 21 instead states that the Doctor is "a member of a race called the Time Lords".

History

On screen

Few details on the history of the planet itself emerge from the original series run from 1963 to 1989. In "The End of the World" (2005), the Ninth Doctor states that his home planet has been destroyed in a war and the Time Lords with it. The episode also indicates that the Time Lords are remembered in the far future.
Subsequently, in "Dalek" (2005), it is revealed that the last great Time War was fought between the Time Lords and the Daleks, ending in the obliteration of both sides and with only two apparent survivors; the Doctor and a lone Dalek that had somehow fallen through time and crashed on Earth. At the conclusion of that episode, that surviving Dalek self-destructs, leaving the Ninth Doctor believing that he was the sole survivor of the Time War. However, the Daleks return in "Bad Wolf"/"The Parting of the Ways" (2005), and subsequently in several other stories.

The Tenth Doctor's reference to Gallifrey in "The Runaway Bride" (2006) is the first time the name of his homeworld has been given onscreen since the new series began. The Doctor's revelation that he is from Gallifrey elicits terror from the Empress of the Racnoss. The Tenth Doctor in human form (as "John Smith") mentions Gallifrey in "Human Nature" (2007) and is asked if it was in Ireland; this is the same question asked in the 1970s stories The Hand of Fear and The Invisible Enemy.

The planet makes its first appearance in the revived series in "The Sound of Drums" (2007), where the Citadel, enclosed in a glass dome (as described by the Doctor in "Gridlock", 2007), is seen in flashback as the Doctor describes it. Also seen is a ceremony initiating 8-year-old Gallifreyans – in particular the Master – into the Time Lord Academy.

"The End of Time" (2009–10) once again featured Gallifrey. By the end of the war, Gallifrey is depicted in ruins. The dome of the main city, the Time Lord capital, the Citadel, is shattered and dozens of Dalek saucers have crashed on the plains below. The Master releases Gallifrey from its time lock. However, Gallifrey's reemergence is eventually stopped and reversed after it is made clear that the release of Gallifrey would lead to the Time Lords destroying time – in effect destroying the universe – to defeat the Daleks and ultimately to preserve the Time Lords at the expense of all creation. Lord President Rassilon also believes that this action would elevate them to a higher form of existence, becoming "creatures of consciousness". Upon realising the scope of Rassilon's plan for self-preservation, the Tenth Doctor recalls that the Doctor that fought in the Time War had attempted to stop them during the war. Eventually, the Master comes to the aid of the Tenth Doctor and prevents Rassilon and the rest of Gallifrey from coming through, breaking the link that held Gallifrey in relative time to 21st-century Earth.

It is stated by the Tenth Doctor in "The End of Time" that Gallifrey is not how he and the Master knew it in their youth. Implying that the Time Lords had resorted to desperate and deplorable measures to fight the Daleks, the Doctor is willing to break his code of non-violence to stop the return of the Time Lords. This is reinforced within a short feature that discloses the hitherto unknown circumstances of the Eighth Doctor's regeneration into the War Doctor, entitled "The Night of the Doctor" (2013). A young pilot rejects assistance from the Eighth Doctor due to her fear of the Time Lords.

In the series seven finale, "The Name of the Doctor", two Gallifreyan mechanics were seen on Gallifrey watching the First Doctor and Susan steal a TARDIS.

In the 50th anniversary special of the television series, "The Day of the Doctor" (2013), scenes are shown during the fall of Arcadia, Gallifrey's second city. Subsequently, it is shown that Gallifrey wasn't actually destroyed. The final scenes depict three of the Doctor's incarnations—the Tenth Doctor, the Eleventh Doctor and the War Doctor; the interface of the weapon, the Moment, that was supposed to destroy the planet; and the Eleventh Doctor's companion Clara Oswald decide against destroying it. Instead, they freeze the planet in time within a parallel pocket universe. This occurs with the help of the other Doctors, including the Twelfth Doctor, whose eyes alone are seen at this point. Instead of destroying Gallifrey, the Dalek fleet echelons open fire on and destroy each other.

In "The Time of the Doctor" (2013), the Time Lords are depicted as trying to re-enter the universe through a crack in the Universe on the planet Trenzalore. They broadcast a message throughout space and time, the question "Doctor Who?", a question which only the Doctor could answer. When the Doctor answers, they will know that it is safe to leave. However, this message inadvertently attracts various races, including the Daleks and Cybermen, to lay siege to Trenzalore; the Eleventh Doctor remaining to protect the inhabitants, but not wanting to release the Time Lords as this would mean the destruction of Trenzalore and the initiation of another Time War. Hundreds of years later, Clara convinces the Time Lords to help the Doctor, dying from old age in his final regeneration, and the crack closes, before reopening in the sky above Trenzalore. The Time Lords give the Doctor a new regeneration cycle, before the crack seals for good with the Time Lords still lost, but a newly regenerated Twelfth Doctor ready to find them. In "Death in Heaven" (2014), Missy tells the Twelfth Doctor that Gallifrey is located at its original coordinates. These claims prove to be false, leaving the Doctor distraught.

The Twelfth Doctor returns to Gallifrey in "Heaven Sent" (2015), having taken the "long way around" through breaking a wall of azbantium after he is teleported inside his confession dial. In "Hell Bent" (2015), Gallifrey is revealed to have indeed returned to its original coordinates as described by Missy, but that it is now situated "several billion years in the future, and [when] the universe is pretty much over" for its own protection. After Rassilon is deposed and exiled by the Twelfth Doctor, Gallifrey is seen in a much later period in the episode abandoned apart from the human immortal Ashildr, who is protected in the Cloisters beneath the Citadel by a reality bubble. The Thirteenth Doctor returns to Gallifrey at the end of the events of "Spyfall" to find everything on it destroyed and a recording of the Master revealing that he orchestrated the planet's destruction. Gallifrey is revealed to have moved to a hitherto unknown wormhole called the Boundary, guarded by Ko Sharmus, at the end of the episode "Ascension of the Cybermen" with the Master reappearing from the planet as well. The Doctor goes through to Gallifrey where she is captured by the Master and through the Matrix the Master shows her she is really the Timeless Child, a figure from Gallifrey's past from whom the secret of regeneration was gained. The Master converts the corpses of Time Lords into Cybermasters, with the power to regenerate. The Doctor threatens him with the Death Particle, a weapon created by the Cyberium capable of destroying all organic life. She was unable to press it but Ko Sharmus did so for her, apparently destroying all life on the planet.

Novels
Various spin-off novels have expanded on the history and nature of Gallifrey.

Marc Platt's novels Cat's Cradle: Time's Crucible and Lungbarrow, provide a detailed backstory for the civilisation seen in the main series. In the Dark Times (occasionally mentioned in the televised serials such as The Five Doctors), Gallifrey was at the centre of an empire covering dozens of worlds and continually being extended by heroes such as Prydonius (after whom the Time Lord chapter is named). Ancient Gallifreyans are all telepathic and were ruled by a female cult centred on a figure called the Pythia, who controlled the population through mysticism and prophecies. When the prophetic powers of the last of the Pythias failed her, Rassilion, Omega and a shadowy figure known as The Other seized power in the name of science and rationality. Seeing this, the Pythia committed suicide and cursed Gallifrey, killing all children in their wombs and making the world sterile. To combat this, Rassilion restructured society and used genetic looms to create new generations of Gallifreyans, who emerge from the looms as fully grown adults. Each of the Great Houses is allotted a total of forty-five cousins and given a regeneration cycle of thirteen lives. The Houses themselves are to some degree alive, in the same way TARDISes are, and the furniture can move about, occasionally growing into 'Drudges' who function as servants for the family. The Doctor was loomed in the House of Lungbarrow in the mountains of South Gallifrey, but unique among the house's cousins, he has a belly button. This sterility backstory is contradicted by on screen depictions and descriptions of the Master and the Doctor as children, the Eleventh Doctor stating he slept in the cot he brings out of his TARDIS and references made to the Doctor and the Master having parents, the Doctor himself being a father and the Master having a daughter.

The Virgin New Adventuresestablish a religion on Gallifrey centred around the three main gods, Time, Death and Pain. The Time Lords use these figures to understand the concepts they represent and in some cases make deals with them and become their chosen champions. The Seventh Doctor is Time's Champion (as well as someone who makes frequent deals with or wages against Death to save his friends){{}} and the audio play Master states that the Master is Death's champion. It's also briefly implied in Vampire Science, that the Eighth Doctor is Life's champion, implying the existence of another unseen figure. Happy Endings and other books imply that these gods are Eternals as seen in the serial Enlightenment.

In the Eighth Doctor Adventures novel The Ancestor Cell by Peter Anghelides and Stephen Cole, Gallifrey is destroyed as a result of the Eighth Doctor's desire to prevent the voodoo cult Faction Paradox from starting a war between the Time Lords and an unnamed Enemy. Hints about this future war are dropped in several books earlier in the series beginning with Lawrence Miles' Alien Bodies. To have boltholes or decoys in case of attack, the Time Lords have created nine separate planet Gallifreys (it even hinted that the original Gallifrey may at some point be reduced to ruins) and special looms to constantly produce new soldiers. By this time TARDISes have evolved to point where they appear human and reproduce sexually (the Doctor's companion Compassion is the first such TARDIS). It is also hinted that the Celestial Intervention Agency will evolve into the beings of pure thought known as the Celestis, who observe the war from outside this dimension (the Last Parliament in which they sit resembles the Panopticon on Gallifrey and the closest anyone gets to describing them is similar to the Time Lords' robes). Faction Paradox itself is a counter to Time Lord society, dedicated to creating time-travel paradoxes, in contrast to the Time Lords' web of time. It was founded by a mysterious figure Grandfather Paradox, who it is believed was once a Time Lord from the House of Lungbarrow. The Ancestor Cell suggests that he is a future version of the Doctor, but this is retconned in The Gallifrey Chronicles, to him being everyone's potential future self. When the Doctor destroys Gallifrey the war no longer happens and his actions also apparently (and retroactively) wipe the Time Lords from history.

In the last regular Eighth Doctor novel, The Gallifrey Chronicles by Lance Parkin, it is revealed that while Gallifrey was destroyed, the Time Lords were not erased from history. However, the cataclysm sets up an event horizon in time that prevents anyone from entering Gallifrey's relative past or travelling from it to the present or future. The Time Lords also survive within the Matrix, which has been downloaded into the Eighth Doctor's mind, but their reconstruction requires a sufficiently advanced computer. At the novel's end, the question of whether or not the Time Lords will be restored remains unanswered.

Television series executive producer Russell T Davies wrote in Doctor Who Magazine No. 356 that there is no connection between the War of the books and the Time War of the television series. In the same Doctor Who Magazine column, Davies compared Gallifrey being destroyed twice with Earth's two World Wars. He also said that he was "usually happy for old and new fans to invent the Complete History of the Doctor in their heads, completely free of the production team's hot and heavy hands".

Notes

References

External links

Doctor Who planets
Fictional destroyed planets